James Marvin Ramstad (May 6, 1946 – November 5, 2020) was an American lawyer and politician who represented Minnesota's 3rd congressional district in the United States House of Representatives from 1991 to 2009. A member of the Republican Party, Ramstad served in the Minnesota Senate from 1981 to 1991.

Ramstad was first elected to the Minnesota Senate in 1981 and was reelected until 1990, when he was elected to represent Minnesota’s 3rd congressional district in the U.S. House of Representatives. Ramstad won reelection in the suburban congressional district eight times, all by landslide margins. He had a reputation as a moderate Republican. Ramstad chose to retire and not seek reelection in 2008. He was succeeded by Republican State Representative Erik Paulsen. Throughout his legislative career and later life, Ramstad, empowered by his prior struggles with alcoholism, was a notable advocate for addiction recovery.

In 2020, Ramstad died from Parkinson's disease at the age of 74.

Early life and education
Ramstad was born in Jamestown, North Dakota on May 6, 1946. He was educated at the University of Minnesota and the George Washington University Law School. He was an officer in the United States Army Reserve from 1968 to 1974. He also worked as a private practice attorney and as a legislative aide to the Minnesota House of Representatives.

Career
He served on the Wayzata-Plymouth Chemical Health Commission, Plymouth Human Rights Commission, and the Minnesota State Human Rights Advisory Committee from 1979 to 1980.

Ramstad was a Republican member of the Minnesota State Senate from 1981 to 1990 before entering the U.S. Congress. He served in the 102nd, 103rd, 104th, 105th, 106th, 107th, 108th, 109th, and 110th congresses, beginning on January 3, 1991. He first defeated former Minneapolis city councilman Lou DeMars in the 1990 election.

Tenure
Ramstad was a member of the United States House of Representatives from 1991 until 2009, representing Minnesota's 3rd congressional district, one of eight congressional districts in Minnesota. On September 17, 2007 Ramstad announced he would not seek reelection in 2008. He reiterated his statement on December 19, 2007.

Ramstad considered ending discrimination against those suffering from mental health and addiction problems a major part of his legacy. He worked under both Republican and Democratic majorities to pass a Mental Health Parity Bill. Mental Health Parity was eventually passed and signed into law in December, 2008.

Ramstad was mentioned as a possible candidate for Director of the Office of National Drug Control Policy in the administration of President Barack Obama. However, the position eventually went to former Seattle police chief Gil Kerlikowske.

Ramstad considered running for Governor of Minnesota in the 2010 election, but decided not to.

At the time of his death, Ramstad was a resident fellow at the Harvard Institute of Politics where he was leading a study group titled The Policy and Politics of Addiction.

Political positions
Ramstad was a member of The Republican Main Street Partnership. He was pro-choice and supported embryonic stem cell research. He was opposed to gay marriage. He voted in favor of an amendment to a whistleblower protection bill that would have allowed the government to influence stem-cell research.

He was considered to be the most moderate Republican member of the Minnesota delegation in the 109th Congress, scoring 68 percent conservative by a conservative group and 21% progressive by a liberal group.

Personal life
Ramstad was a recovering alcoholic. For a time, he was Rep. Patrick J. Kennedy's Alcoholics Anonymous sponsor. He was a long-time advocate for addiction treatment and recovery services, and at the time of his death he had been sober for 39 years.

Ramstad's sister, Sheryl Ramstad, is a Tax Court judge in Minnesota. Ramstad was a member of the United Church of Christ.

On February 25, 2008, it was announced that Ramstad had been elected to the board of directors of the National Center on Addiction and Substance Abuse at Columbia University.

In 2010, Ramstad joined alliantgroup as a Senior Advisor on their Strategic Advisory Board.

He died of Parkinson's disease on November 5, 2020, aged 74, at his home in Wayzata, Minnesota.

Committee assignments
 Ways and Means Committee
 Subcommittee on Oversight (Ranking Member)
 Subcommittee on Health
 Co-chair of the Addiction Treatment and Recovery Caucus
 Co-chair of the Disabilities Caucus
 Co-chair of the Law Enforcement Caucus
 Co-chair of the Medical Technology Caucus

Electoral history

Write-in and minor candidate notes:  In 1996, write-ins received 417 votes.  In 1998, write-ins received 250 votes.  In 2002, write-ins received 309 votes.  In 2004, write-ins received 356 votes.  In 2006, write-ins received 323 votes.

References

External links

 
 
 MPR – Campaign 2006: Jim Ramstad profile from Minnesota Public Radio

1946 births
2020 deaths
Republican Party Minnesota state senators
George Washington University Law School alumni
University of Minnesota alumni
People from Jamestown, North Dakota
Military personnel from North Dakota
United Church of Christ members
People from Minnetonka, Minnesota
Neurological disease deaths in Minnesota
Republican Party members of the United States House of Representatives from Minnesota
21st-century American politicians
Deaths from Parkinson's disease
Harvard Fellows